The sone is a unit of loudness.

Sone may also refer to:
 Sone (surname) (曽根), a Japanese surname
Sone Station (disambiguation)
 Son River
 a Fandom name for Girls Generation

See also
Sones (disambiguation)